In mathematics, the notion of cancellative is a generalization of the notion of invertible.

An element a in a magma  has the left cancellation property (or is left-cancellative) if for all b and c in M,  always implies that .

An element a in a magma  has the right cancellation property (or is right-cancellative) if for all b and c in M,  always implies that .

An element a in a magma  has the two-sided cancellation property (or is cancellative) if it is both left- and right-cancellative.

A magma  has the left cancellation property (or is left-cancellative) if  all a in the magma are left cancellative, and similar definitions apply for the right cancellative or two-sided cancellative properties.

A left-invertible element is left-cancellative, and analogously for right and two-sided.

For example, every quasigroup, and thus every group, is cancellative.

Interpretation
To say that an element a in a magma  is left-cancellative, is to say that the function  is injective. That the function g is injective implies that given some equality of the form a ∗ x = b, where the only unknown is x, there is only one possible value of x satisfying the equality. More precisely, we are able to define some function f, the inverse of g, such that for all x . Put another way, for all x and y in M, if a * x = a * y, then x = y.

Examples of cancellative monoids and semigroups
The positive (equally non-negative) integers form a cancellative semigroup under addition. The non-negative integers form a cancellative monoid under addition.

In fact, any free semigroup or monoid obeys the cancellative law, and in general, any semigroup or monoid embedding into a group (as the above examples clearly do) will obey the cancellative law.

In a different vein, (a subsemigroup of) the multiplicative semigroup of elements of a ring that are not zero divisors (which is just the set of all nonzero elements if the ring in question is a domain, like the integers) has the cancellation property. Note that this remains valid even if the ring in question is noncommutative and/or nonunital.

Non-cancellative algebraic structures
Although the cancellation law holds for addition, subtraction, multiplication and division of real and complex numbers (with the single exception of multiplication by zero and division of zero by another number), there are a number of algebraic structures where the cancellation law is not valid.

The cross product of two vectors  does not obey the cancellation law. If , then it does not follow that  even if .

Matrix multiplication also does not necessarily obey the cancellation law. If , then B might not equal C, because the matrix equation  will not have a unique solution for a non-invertible matrix A.

See also
 Grothendieck group
 Invertible element
 Cancellative semigroup
 Integral domain

References

Non-associative algebra
Properties of binary operations
Algebraic properties of elements

fr:Loi de composition interne#Réguliers et dérivés